Joseph McCarthy (1908–1957) was a United States Senator and anti-Communist who is the namesake for McCarthyism.

Joseph or Joe McCarthy may also refer to:

Sports
Joe McCarthy (catcher) (1881–1937), American baseball catcher
Joe McCarthy (manager) (1887–1978), American baseball manager
Joe McCarthy (wrestler) (1929–2012), American professional wrestler
Joey McCarthy (born 1972), American NASCAR driver
Joe McCarthy (outfielder) (born 1994), American baseball outfielder
Joe McCarthy (rugby union) (born 2001), American-born Irish rugby union player

Military
Joseph J. McCarthy (1911–1996), American Medal of Honor recipient at the Battle of Iwo Jima
Joseph Aidan MacCarthy (1914–1995), Irish-born medical officer in the Royal Air Force
Joe McCarthy (RCAF officer) (1919–1998), American-born volunteer pilot in the Royal Canadian Air Force who flew in Operation Chastise

Others
Joseph Edward McCarthy (1876–1955), American Roman Catholic Bishop of Portland, 1932–1955
Joseph W. McCarthy (1884–1965), American architect
Joseph McCarthy (lyricist) (1885–1943), American song lyricist and director of ASCAP
Joe McCarthy (Irish musician) (born 1936), Irish musician with the showband group The Dixies